Norma Carranza De León is a Puerto Rican politician from the New Progressive Party (PNP). She served as member of the Senate of Puerto Rico from 1993 to 2001. He has a Bachelor's degree in Sciences of the nutrition from the University of Puerto Rico, a master's degree in that subject at Tulane University School of Medicine, and a doctorate in medicine from the Dominican University.

Carranza was elected to the Senate of Puerto Rico in the 1992 general election. She represented the District of Arecibo, along with Víctor Marrero Padilla. Carranza was reelected at the 1996 general election.

Carranza ran for a third term at the 2000 general elections, but was defeated by the candidates of the PPD.

Since her departure from Puerto Rican politics, Norma Carranza, returned to the private medical practice.

See also
21st Senate of Puerto Rico

References

Living people
Members of the Senate of Puerto Rico
People from Hatillo, Puerto Rico
Tulane University School of Medicine alumni
University of Puerto Rico alumni
20th-century Puerto Rican women politicians
20th-century Puerto Rican politicians
Year of birth missing (living people)
21st-century Puerto Rican women politicians
21st-century Puerto Rican politicians